Liuba may refer to:

 Liuba, a Slavic feminine given name cognate to Lyuba
 Liuba Dragomir, Moldovan football player
 Liuba Gantcheva, Bulgarian intellectual and writer
 Liuba María Hevia, singer and composer from Cuba
 Liuba Grechen Shirley, American politician
 Liuba Shrira, American university professor
 Liuba County, a subdivision of China